Fine Dead Girls (also distributed internationally as Nice Dead Girls) is a 2002 Croatian drama film that premiered in July 2002, at the Pula Film Festival. The film has been named one of the best Croatian films since Croatia's independence. It caught much attention due to its controversial, provocative themes.

Plot 
Iva (Olga Pakalović) and Marija (Nina Violić), a lesbian couple, rent an apartment in Zagreb in a building that seems to provide a quiet and safe environment for their love, but over time the atmosphere in the building becomes more and more threatening.

The elder landlady Olga (Inge Appelt) dominates the building. Other tenants include her calm husband, her grown-up son Daniel (Krešimir Mikić) who has a crush on Iva, the prostitute Lidija (Jadranka Đokić), an abused housewife, a widower keeping the corpse of his newly deceased wife, a gynecologist (Boris Miholjević) performing abortions in one flat of the house, and an ex-soldier who regularly plays martial music at night. The characters are meant to display the madness of the post-war Croatian society.

Marija's conservative religious father secretly stalks his daughter, and pays Lidija to try to seduce Iva, which fails.

After Olga finds out that Iva and Marija are lesbians, the situation escalates to rape, murder and kidnapping.

Cast 
 Olga Pakalović as Iva
 Nina Violić as Marija
 Krešimir Mikić as Daniel
 Inge Appelt as Olga the Landlady
 Ivica Vidović as Blaž
 Milan Štrljić as Inspektor
 Mirko Boman
 Jadranka Đokić as Lidija the Prostitute
 Boris Miholjević as Perić the Gynecologist
  as Marina Kostelac
 Janko Rakos

Awards and nominations

Pula Film Festival 2002 
 Audience Award "Golden Gate Pula"
 Big Golden Arena
 Golden Arena
 Best Actor in a Supporting Role: Ivica Vidović
 Best Actress in a Supporting Role: Olga Pakalović
 Best Director: Dalibor Matanić

Geneva Cinéma Tout Ecran 2003 
 Young Jury Award – Dalibor Matanić

Sochi International Film Festival 2003 
 Special Jury Award – Dalibor Matanić (tied with At kende sandheden (2002))
 Golden Rose – Dalibor Matanić (nominated)

75th Academy Awards 
 Croatia's submission for the Academy Award for Best Foreign Language Film (not nominated)

References

External links 

Fine Dead Girls at Filmski-Programi.hr 

2002 films
Croatian drama films
Croatian LGBT-related films
Lesbian-related films
Films directed by Dalibor Matanić
Films set in Zagreb
Films shot in Croatia
LGBT-related drama films
2002 LGBT-related films
2002 drama films